René Hoffmann (4 July 1942 – 6 November 2019) was a Luxembourgian football goalkeeper.

References

1942 births
2019 deaths
Luxembourgian footballers
Jeunesse Esch players
Association football goalkeepers
Luxembourg international footballers